Charlotte Emma Aitchison (born 2 August 1992), known professionally as Charli XCX, is an English singer and songwriter. Born in Cambridge and raised in Start Hill, Essex, she began posting songs on Myspace in 2008, which led to her discovery by a promoter who invited her to perform at warehouse raves. In 2010, she signed a recording contract with Asylum Records, releasing a series of singles and mixtapes throughout 2011 and 2012.

In 2012, Charli XCX rose to prominence with the Icona Pop collaboration "I Love It", which became an international success, reaching top 10 in North America and Europe. Her debut studio album, True Romance (2013), was released that year to critical acclaim but failed to meet commercial expectations. In 2014, she contributed the hook and bridge to "Fancy" by rapper Iggy Azalea, which finished the year as one of the best-selling singles worldwide and was nominated for two Grammy Awards. The same year, Charli XCX released "Boom Clap", which became her first solo top-ten single on the Billboard Hot 100. Her second studio album, the punk-influenced Sucker, was released at the end of the year, and spawned the successful singles "Break the Rules" and "Doing It".

In 2015, Charli XCX began working alongside producers associated with the UK collective PC Music, developing a more experimental sound and image. While working on her third album, she released the Vroom Vroom EP (2016) and the mixtapes Number 1 Angel and Pop 2 (both 2017), as well as a series of singles including the BPI-certified "After the Afterparty", "Boys", and "1999". Her third and fourth studio albums, Charli (2019) and How I'm Feeling Now (2020), received widespread acclaim; the latter was created within a span of six weeks during the COVID-19 lockdowns. In 2021, Charli XCX co-wrote and provided vocals on the Jax Jones and Joel Corry single "Out Out". The singer's fifth album, Crash, was released in March 2022, and became her biggest commercial success to date.

In addition to her solo work, Charli XCX has co-written songs for other artists, including Iggy Azalea's "Beg for It" (2014), Selena Gomez's "Same Old Love" (2015), Blondie's "Tonight" (2017), the Shawn Mendes & Camila Cabello duet "Señorita" (2019), and the Sigala & Rita Ora collaboration "You for Me" (2022).

Early life
Charlotte Emma Aitchison was born on 2 August 1992, in Cambridge, England. Her father, Jon Aitchison, is a Scottish entrepreneur and former show-booker, and her mother, Shameera, is a former nurse and flight attendant who was born and raised in Uganda to a Gujarati Indian family. Charli was raised in Start Hill, Essex, and attended Bishop's Stortford College in nearby Bishop's Stortford. While her parents were not very musical, she demonstrated an affinity for music from an early age, being interested in pop acts such as the Spice Girls and Britney Spears. She began writing songs at the age of 14, writing a song called "Fish and Chips Shop".

At 14, she convinced her parents to grant her a loan to record her first album, 14, and in early 2008, began posting songs from the album, as well as numerous other demos, on her official Myspace page. This caught the attention of a promoter running numerous illegal warehouse raves and parties in east London, who invited her to perform. She was billed on flyers under the stage name Charli XCX, which was her MSN Messenger display name when she was younger. Despite the illicit nature of the gigs, her parents were supportive of her career and attended several raves with her. In late 2008, while 14 was never commercially released, she released the two singles "!Franchesckaar!" and double A-side "Emelline"/"Art Bitch", under Orgy Music. She has since frequently expressed her distaste for her music of the time, going as far to call it "gimmicky dance tracks" and "fucking terrible Myspace music". At the age of 18, Charli moved to London to study for a fine art degree at UCL's Slade School of Fine Art but dropped out in her second year.

Career

2009–2013: Career beginnings and True Romance

In 2010, Charli XCX was signed to Asylum Records. She later described herself as being "lost". In an interview with The Guardian, Charli XCX said: "I was still in school, I'd just come out of this weird rave scene, and I wasn't really sure what to make of that. And when I got signed I hated pop music; I wanted to make bad rap music. I didn't know who I was. I didn't know what I liked. Even though I was signed, I was still figuring it out." She eventually flew out to Los Angeles to meet producers, and found it "wasn't working out for me" until she met with American producer Ariel Rechtshaid. They had a two-hour session and wrote the song "Stay Away". She stated that's "when things started to come together". Early in 2011, she was featured on the Alex Metric single "End of the World". She left during the second year of her degree course at the Slade School of Fine Art to focus on her music career, and in May and November 2011, she released the singles "Stay Away" and "Nuclear Seasons" respectively, and gained attention from music website Pitchfork, where she earned "Best New Track" accolades for both; the former was eventually named to the site's "Best Tracks of 2011" list.

In addition to Rechtshaid, she began working with Swedish producer Patrik Berger. He sent her two beats, and she quickly wrote songs for each, one of which became "I Love It" and the other of which became "You're the One". She stated she didn't end up releasing "I Love It" herself as she could not reconcile it with her sound, but in 2012, Swedish duo Icona Pop re-recorded the song and released it as a single featuring her vocals. The song became an international hit, hitting number 1 in Charli's home country and climbing to number 7 on the Billboard Hot 100 in 2013. In June, she released "You're the One" as a single from her EP of the same name, followed by her debut mixtape Heartbreaks and Earthquakes, a one-track file consisting of eight songs including a cover of the Blood Orange song "Champagne Coast" and Odd Future's remix of "You're the One". In September, she released a video for "So Far Away", and on Halloween, she released a new song called "Cloud Aura" featuring Brooke Candy, followed by her second mixtape Super Ultra, released exclusively through her website in November. In early 2013, she released "You (Ha Ha Ha)" and announced her debut album, followed by "What I Like" in March.
True Romance was released in April 2013. It peaked at number 85 on the UK Albums Chart, at number five on the US Billboard Top Heatseekers, and at number 11 on the Australian Hitseekers Albums Chart. The album was received well by music critics, earning a 76/100 on Metacritic, which assigns a rating out of 100 to reviews from mainstream critics, indicating "generally favorable reviews". In May, she released a song with Welsh singer-songwriter Marina and the Diamonds, called "Just Desserts", followed by the video for "Take My Hand" later that month.

2013–2015: Breakthrough and Sucker

Charli XCX began writing her second album in mid-2013, saying she initially wanted to go to India to record, but later decided she wanted to record in France, she said: "Two months ago, I wanted to go to India and record it, and now I want to record it in France. So I feel like nothing is definite – like, I feel very all-over-the-place at the moment. But at the moment, my heart's set on going to France and recording it, but that was different two months ago, so who knows what's going to happen?" Frustrated with the music industry, she ended up going to Sweden, isolating herself from her record label, and made a punk-inspired album over a month. Working on the album with Patrik Berger, they made it at a fast pace, saying that it is "not thought-about, everything really spontaneous [...] We don't think — it's like the first thing that comes out of my mouth is the cut on the record," however it was eventually scrapped for a more "pop"-oriented album. The album included a song called "Mow That Lawn", which was debuted live a year later at Ilosaarirock Festival in Finland.

In late 2013, "SuperLove" was released as the lead single from the album, and reached number sixty-two on the UK Singles Chart, becoming Charli's first solo entry on the chart. In January 2014, she released a song called "Allergic to Love" on her SoundCloud. While writing the album, she did further sessions with Weezer frontman Rivers Cuomo, Rostam Batmanglij from Vampire Weekend, production duo Stargate, John Hill, and a session with Dr. Luke which she said "wasn't for me”. In an interview with DIY magazine, she stated that she wrote the record for girls and wants them to feel "a sense of empowerment". Charli explained in her tour diary with Replay Laserblast that the record's genre is still pop, but has a very shouty, girl-power, girl-gang, Bow Wow Wow feel to it at the same time. She also said in an interview with Idolator that the album would be influenced by the Hives, Weezer, the Ramones and 1960s yé-yé music. "SuperLove" was eventually scrapped from the album.

In early 2014, she was featured on Australian rapper Iggy Azalea's single "Fancy"; the track topped the US Billboard Hot 100, becoming both artists' first number-one single on the chart. Charli XCX expanded her portfolio of songwriting for other artists during this period, with credits on Azalea's 2014 single "Beg for It", Ryn Weaver's debut single "OctaHate", and material for acts including Sky Ferreira, Neon Jungle, Rihanna, and Gwen Stefani. In mid-2014, Charli XCX contributed the song "Boom Clap" to the soundtrack of the film The Fault in Our Stars. "Boom Clap" peaked at number eight on the Billboard Hot 100 and at number six in the UK, and was certified platinum in Australia. In an interview with Popjustice in June, she stated she had finished writing sessions and expected the album to be finished by the end of July. In August, Sucker was announced to be released in October, along with the lead single "Break the Rules". She said the song came out about after she had made her punk album in Sweden, when she "came out of the other side of that punk phase and translated it into something more pop." She stated that the album was "obviously, [...] about not giving a fuck." The album was pushed back the next month due to the success of "Boom Clap", and was officially released in December 2014 in North America and February 2015 in Europe. It debuted at number 28 on the US Billboard 200, making it Charli's first album to enter the chart, and number 15 on the UK Albums Chart. The album's third single, "Doing It", featuring fellow British singer Rita Ora, was released in February, and peaked at number 8 on the UK Singles Chart.

Charli XCX opened for Katy Perry on the European leg of her Prismatic World Tour in early 2015, headlined her own UK tour, and featured alongside R&B artist Tinashe on fellow singer Ty Dolla Sign's single "Drop That Kitty". In May 2015, Charli XCX released "Famous", as the fourth single taken from Sucker. A music video was released in March, and was ranked by Time and Pitchfork as the 5th and 19th best pop music video of the year, respectively. In July and August 2015, Charli XCX co-headlined a US tour with Jack Antonoff. She announced on 21 August that, for "personal reasons", a planned second leg of the tour would not go ahead.

2015–2018: Vroom Vroom, Number 1 Angel, and Pop 2

In a July 2015 interview, Charli XCX said that she was working on her third album and described it as "the most pop thing, and the most electronic thing" she had ever done. Scottish producer Sophie, along with BloodPop and Stargate, were confirmed to be involved in the album's production. In October 2015, she premiered new song "Vroom Vroom" on the Beats 1 Radio Show, then claiming it would be the first song released from her third studio album. On 23 February 2016, it was announced that she had set up a new experimental pop record label, Vroom Vroom Recordings, and that she would release an EP titled Vroom Vroom on 26 February 2016. The title song was officially released that day. The second song released from the EP, titled "Trophy", received its first play on Zane Lowe's Beats 1 show on that night. It was also announced that she would also host her own Beats 1 show fortnightly. Vroom Vroom was produced mainly by Sophie as a teaser for her third studio album. The avant-pop EP marked a sharp shift in tone from her previous album, and was released to polarising reviews. A music video for the song "Vroom Vroom" was released on 22 April 2016 via Apple Music.

In July 2016, it was announced that British producer A. G. Cook, founder of record label PC Music, had signed on as Charli's creative director. On 28 October, the then lead single from her third album, "After the Afterparty", was released. A music video was released two days later. It charted at 29 in the UK Singles Chart, and was certified silver by the BPI. On 8 February 2017, she performed it on Jimmy Kimmel Live!, along with a new song titled "Bounce", featuring Kyary Pamyu Pamyu. She said in an interview that month that her album was finished and to be released in September. On 10 March 2017, Charli XCX released the mixtape, Number 1 Angel, which featured a line-up of all female guest appearances from MØ, Raye, Starrah, Uffie, Abra, and Cupcakke and was produced largely by PC Music artists including A.G. Cook, EasyFun and featured further production by Sophie.

On 17 March 2017, Mura Masa released his single "1 Night", which featured vocals from Charli XCX. On 26 July 2017, Charli XCX released "Boys", along with a self-directed music video featuring an ensemble cast of male celebrities, including Joe Jonas and Brendon Urie, among others; it peaked at number 2 on the Top 25 YouTube list on 27 July, receiving almost two millions views in under 24 hours. On 6 August, Charli XCX performed at Lollapalooza music festival 2017. On 20 August 2017, the majority of Charli XCX's third studio album was leaked with the remainder of the tracks leaking in the following year. The leak of the album featuring the then-lead single "After the Afterparty" led to the album being cancelled and Charli deciding to remake an entirely new third studio album.

The Number 1 Angel follow-up mixtape, Pop 2, was released on 15 December 2017, featuring collaborations with Carly Rae Jepsen, Tove Lo, Alma, Caroline Polachek, Brooke Candy, Cupcakke, Pabllo Vittar, Dorian Electra, Mykki Blanco, Tommy Cash, Kim Petras, Jay Park and MØ. On 15 March 2018, Charli XCX performed to promote her mixtape Pop 2 at El Rey Theatre in Los Angeles.

From May 2018, Charli XCX started performing on Taylor Swift's Reputation Stadium Tour as an opening act alongside Camila Cabello. Since then, she released several singles. On 31 May, she released "5 in the Morning", which was debuted on the first date of Swift's tour. On 29 June, she released the singles "Focus" and "No Angel". On 27 July, she released the single "Girls Night Out", which had previously been performed live and leaked in 2017.

In October 2021, Pitchfork published an article entitled Pitchfork Reviews: Rescored where the publication revisited critic's previous album scores awarded to 19 albums since the 90s. Charli's Vroom Vroom EP was rescored upwards from 4.5 to 7.8, with the authors stating of the album "when you don't think too hard about it, it's pretty fun".

2018–2020: Charli and How I'm Feeling Now

On 5 October 2018, Charli XCX released the single "1999" with South African–Australian artist Troye Sivan, as the lead single from her third album Charli. The single reached number 13 on the UK Singles Chart and became Charli XCX's tenth Top 40 single and also her first Top 15 single since 2015. The music video for “1999” was released on 11 October and starred Charli XCX and Sivan, featuring various references to 1990's pop culture. Charli XCX was featured on MØ‘s album Forever Neverland with the song “If It’s Over”.

On 16 May 2019, Charli XCX released the second single from Charli, "Blame It on Your Love", featuring American singer and rapper Lizzo. The track was written in Los Angeles and produced by long standing collaborators Stargate with additional production by A. G. Cook and EasyFun. Elements from "Blame It on Your Love" were taken from a previous release, "Track 10", from her 2017 mixtape Pop 2. On 25 May, Charli XCX performed at BBC Radio 1's Big Weekend. On 30 May, she performed a new song from Charli with Christine and the Queens titled "Gone" at Primavera Sound in Barcelona. On 30 May, Charli XCX collaborated with Diplo and Herve Pagez on the song “Spicy”. On 3 June, she revealed that she recorded another song for Charli with Troye Sivan, marking their second collaboration after "1999". This song, later revealed to be named "2099", was performed live for the first time at Go West Fest on 6 June at the Wiltern in Los Angeles. On 7 June, Charli XCX released a collaboration track titled "Dream Glow" with Jin, Jimin and Jungkook of the South Korean boy band BTS for the soundtrack to their upcoming Netmarble game, BTS World.

Details of Charli were revealed on Amazon on 13 June. On 17 July, "Gone" was released as the third single from the album. The first promotional single, "Cross You Out" featuring Sky Ferreira, was released on 16 August, followed by the second to fourth promotional singles: "Warm", featuring HAIM, on 30 August; “February 2017”, featuring Clairo and Yaeji, on 6 September; and "2099", featuring Troye Sivan, on 10 September. The album was released on 13 September by Asylum and Atlantic Records.

On 13 January 2020, Charli XCX was featured on the Galantis song "We Are Born to Play", which was used as the theme song for the upcoming Japanese theme park Super Nintendo World. The following month, she was featured on 100 Gecs’s single "Ringtone" with Kero Kero Bonito and Rico Nasty. Amid the COVID-19 pandemic, Charli XCX announced a new album, titled How I'm Feeling Now in April 2020. She subsequently released the singles "Forever", "Claws" and "I Finally Understand". How I'm Feeling Now was released on 15 May 2020. The album was written and recorded in the span of six weeks during the COVID-19 lockdowns. She used her platform on instagram to communicate with fans while making the album, posting different variations of lyrics, single covers, and sound samples, that could be voted on, the most popular being the one she released officially. According to Metacritic, the album currently ties with Pop 2 as Charli XCX's most acclaimed project to date, with Kitty Empire of The Guardian describing it as "a work of its time." Due to the COVID-19 pandemic. Charli XCX was unable to perform anything from the album until 13 months after the albums release. Charli XCX headlined Wynwood Pride in Miami. This was her first performance post-pandemic and the first time songs from How I'm Feeling Now were played in front of a live audience. Song include "Claws", "Forever" and "Visions".

2021–present: Crash

Early in February 2021, the Dirty Hit signed musician No Rome announced he was working on a track featuring Charli XCX along with label mates The 1975. On 19 February, she featured on a new version of a track called "CHARGER" by the British-Canadian artist ELIO. In a TikTok posted on 16 March, she revealed that she is working on her next studio album, saying she was "feeling very inspired". She also stated in a tweet from June 2020 that her next album will be her final record with Atlantic Records. On 2 September, "Good Ones" was released as the lead single from her upcoming album. A second single, "New Shapes", featuring Christine and the Queens and Caroline Polachek, was released on 4 November. Along with the single release, Charli XCX officially announced her fifth studio album, titled Crash, which was released on 18 March 2022. A third single, "Beg for You", featuring Rina Sawayama, was released 27 January.

Artistry

Musical style

Music critics have described Charli XCX's music in a variety of terms including dance-pop, electropop, pop punk and alternative pop. Her early recordings were described as a blend of dark wave and witch house. As her career progressed, she showcased several other musical styles such as gothic pop and synth-pop in her debut album, her second album was described as pop punk containing elements of punk rock, new wave and power pop. Her latest projects explored an avant-pop direction, Vroom Vroom contained elements of Eurodance, meanwhile Number 1 Angel showed influences of trap, R&B, electropop, synth-pop and experimental pop. Charli XCX's singing voice has been compared to that of Gwen Stefani and Marina and the Diamonds. Charli XCX has recently been described as a figurehead of the 2010s "hyperpop" style, though she rejected the term on social media, stating that she does "not identify with music genres."

Influences
Charli XCX's influences include Avril Lavigne, Britney Spears, Shampoo, No Doubt, t.A.T.u., the Donnas, Bikini Kill, Martika, Belinda Carlisle, the Cure, the Feminine Complex, Siouxsie and the Banshees, Donna Summer, Marilyn Manson, Bread, the Spice Girls, All Saints, Uffie, Brooke Candy, Lil Wayne, Kate Bush, Twin Peaks, Paris Hilton, Justice, Crystal Castles, Calvin Harris, Björk, Quentin Tarantino and Siouxsie Sioux. She has named singer Siouxsie Sioux as her "hero" and Rihanna as her "favorite pop girl." The Hives, Weezer, Ramones and 1960s yé-yé music all influenced her second album. She cited Kanye West as an inspiration for her idiosyncratic use of Auto-Tune. She has said that "the best artists are the ones who constantly change—Madonna, [David] Bowie" and that her "dream collaboration would be with someone like Björk, Kate Bush, or even Dionne Warwick". She also said that she learned about performing and attracting a crowd from Taylor Swift.

Personal life
Charli XCX has spoken about her experiences with sound-to-colour synesthesia. She states, "I see music in colours. I love music that's black, pink, purple or red—but I hate music that's green, yellow or brown." 

She has stated that she is "extremely proud" of her Indian heritage.

Charli XCX previously dated filmmaker Ryan Andrews, who directed numerous music videos at the start of her career, notably "Nuclear Seasons" (2011), "You (Ha Ha Ha)" (2013) and "Super Love" (2013). In 2019, Charli XCX was in a long-term partnership with Huck Kwong, whom she had previously dated in 2014, and has been friends with since 2012.

Charli XCX is now dating The 1975 drummer and producer George Daniel. The couple first met while working on the No Rome track "Spinning", released on 4 March 2021, and they collaborated again on her album Crash, released on 18 March 2022, on the album's title track and several songs on its deluxe edition. Charli XCX divides her time between London and Los Angeles.

Activism
Charli XCX considers herself as a feminist and wrote her song "Body of My Own" as a feminist statement. She also appeared in the documentary about gender equality The F Word and Me, which premiered on BBC Three in 2015.

In July 2020, she signed an open letter to the UK Equalities minister at that time, Liz Truss, calling for a ban on all forms of LGBT+ conversion therapy.

Discography

 True Romance (2013)
 Sucker (2014)
 Charli (2019)
 How I'm Feeling Now (2020)
 Crash (2022)

Tours

Headlining

 Girl Power North America Tour (2014)
 Charli and Jack Do America Tour (2015)
 Number 1 Angel Tour (2017)
 Pop 2 Tour (2018)
 Charli Live Tour (2019–2020)
 Crash the Live Tour (2022-2023)

Supporting

 The Ting Tings – Show Us Yours Tour (2011)
 Sleigh Bells – (2012)
 Azealia Banks – Mermaid Ball (2012)
 Coldplay – Mylo Xyloto Tour (2012)
 Ellie Goulding – The Halcyon Days Tour (2013)
 Marina and the Diamonds – The Lonely Hearts Club Tour (2013)
 Paramore – The Self-Titled Tour (2013)
 Katy Perry – Prismatic World Tour (2015)
 Halsey – Hopeless Fountain Kingdom Tour (2017)
 Sia – Nostalgic for the Present Tour (2017)
 Taylor Swift – Reputation Stadium Tour (2018)

Filmography

Music videos

Film

Television

Podcast

Awards and nominations

Notes

References

External links

 
 
 
 
 Charli XCX's Best Song Ever (BBC Radio 1)

 
Living people
1992 births
21st-century English women singers
21st-century English singers
Alumni of the Slade School of Fine Art
Art pop singers
Asylum Records artists
Atlantic Records artists
Avant-pop musicians
Dance-pop musicians
Electropop musicians
English electronic musicians
English women pop singers
English songwriters
English feminists
English people of Indian descent
English people of Scottish descent
English people of Gujarati descent
English women in electronic music
English women songwriters
Experimental pop musicians
Feminist musicians
Iamsound Records artists
NME Awards winners
People educated at Bishop's Stortford College
People from Cambridge
Pop punk singers
Power pop musicians
Singers from Cambridgeshire
Singers from Essex
Synth-pop singers
Hyperpop musicians